Barg-e Jahan (also Romanized as Barg-e Jahān; also known as Bafkejan and Bafkijan) is a village in Lavasan-e Kuchak Rural District, Lavasanat District, Shemiranat County, Tehran Province, Iran. Literally, Barg-e-Jahan means Leaf-of-the-World in Persian language which indicates the green area of the surroundings. At the 2016 census, its population was 628, in 226 families.

The village enjoys cool summers and is therefore used as a recreational village for those living in busy Tehran, especially in summer season. Most of its region is covered by fruit gardens including wall-nuts, apples, cherries, sour-cherries, plums and apricots.

References

External links 
 

Populated places in Shemiranat County